Hollym Gate railway station is a disused railway station on the North Eastern Railway's Hull and Holderness Railway to the west of Hollym, East Riding of Yorkshire, England. It was opened in 1855. The station was closed to passengers on 1 September 1870.

References

 
 

Disused railway stations in the East Riding of Yorkshire
Railway stations in Great Britain opened in 1855
Railway stations in Great Britain closed in 1870
Former North Eastern Railway (UK) stations
Hull and Holderness Railway